A Simple Story may refer to:
 A Simple Story (novel) by Elizabeth Inchbald
 A Simple Story, a novella by Shmuel Yosef Agnon, translated from the 1935 Hebrew original, Sippur Pashut 
 A Simple Story (1970 film), a 1970 Tunisian film
 A Simple Story (1978 film), a 1978 film
 A Simple Story (1960 film), a 1960 Soviet drama film

See also
Una storia semplice (disambiguation)